Macon is a city in Noxubee County, Mississippi along the Noxubee River. The population was 2,768 at the 2010 census. It is the county seat of Noxubee County.

History
In 1817, Jackson's Military Road was built at the urging of Andrew Jackson to provide a direct connection between Nashville and New Orleans. The road crossed the Noxubee River just west of Macon, located at the old Choctaw village of Taladega, now the site of the local golf club. The road declined in importance in the 1840s, largely due to the difficulty of travel in the swamps surrounding the Noxubee River in and west of Macon.

The route for the most part was replaced by the Robinson Road, which ran through Agency and Louisville before joining the Natchez Trace, bypassing Macon.

On September 15, 1830, US government officials met with an audience of 6,000 Choctaw men, women and children at Dancing Rabbit Creek to explain the policy of removal through interpreters. The Choctaws faced migration west of the Mississippi River or submitting to U.S. and state law as citizens.

The treaty would sign away the remaining traditional homeland to the United States; however, a provision in the treaty made removal more acceptable.

The town was named Macon on August 10, 1835 in honor of Nathaniel Macon, a statesman from North Carolina.

The city served as the capital for the state of Mississippi during the Civil War from 1863 onward.

The legislature was housed in the Calhoun Institute, which also housed Governor Charles Clark's office and served as one of several hospital sites in Macon.

In October 1865, Governor Benjamin Humphreys attempted to retrieve the furniture from the governor's mansion to Jackson, however it had been either destroyed or stolen.

On June 27, 1919, in an incident described as part of the Red Summer, a mob of white citizens including a banker and a deputy sheriff, among many others, attacked prominent black citizens. On May 20, 1927, Dan Anderson was lynched in Macon.

Geography

Demographics
In 2016, Macon was the poorest town in the United States with a population between 1,000 and 25,000 people.

2020 census

As of the 2020 United States Census, there were 2,582 people, 1,110 households, and 724 families residing in the city.

2000 census
As of the census of 2000, there were 2,461 people, 906 households, and 587 families residing in the city. The population density was 1,624.8 people per square mile (629.3/km2). There were 1,015 housing units at an average density of 670.1 per square mile (259.5/km2). The racial makeup of the city was 31.49% White, 67.33% African American, 0.20% Native American, 0.41% Asian, 0.08% from other races, and 0.49% from two or more races. Hispanic or Latino of any race were 0.41% of the population.

There were 906 households, out of which 32.6% had children under the age of 18 living with them, 34.0% were married couples living together, 27.5% had a female householder with no husband present, and 35.1% were non-families. 33.1% of all households were made up of individuals, and 16.3% had someone living alone who was 65 years of age or older. The average household size was 2.53 and the average family size was 3.25.

In the city, the population was spread out, with 28.9% under the age of 18, 10.3% from 18 to 24, 27.8% from 25 to 44, 16.2% from 45 to 64, and 16.8% who were 65 years of age or older. The median age was 33 years. For every 100 females, there were 82.6 males. For every 100 females age 18 and over, there were 80.5 males.

The median income for a household in the city was $20,800, and the median income for a family was $26,696. Males had a median income of $22,969 versus $16,898 for females. The per capita income for the city was $12,568. About 29.2% of families and 36.0% of the population were below the poverty line, including 50.3% of those under age 18 and 21.8% of those age 65 or over.

Arts and culture
The Noxubee County library is located in Macon. The building, which was constructed as a jail in 1907, still contains a gallows.

Education
Historically, the city of Macon had the largest schools in Noxubee County, including Macon High School (Mississippi). In 1917, the city proposed consolidation of the school district with Noxubee County, with the goal of replacing the single-teacher system prevalent throughout the county.

The City of Macon is now served by the Noxubee County School District. East Mississippi Community College offers some courses at Noxubee County High School in Macon.

When federal courts mandated integration of the public schools, a segregation academy, Central Academy, was built in Macon, secretly using public school funds to construct the private school. White student enrollment in public schools dropped from 829 to 71 during this period. Attendance at Central Academy eventually dwindled to 51 students, resulting in the shuttering of the school following the 2017 school year.

Media
The first newspaper in Macon was the Macon intelligencer, which operated from 1838 to 1840. Another paper, the Macon Herald ran from 1841 to 1842. The Macon Beacon was established in 1849. It served Macon as a daily from 1859 to 1995. It continues to operate as a weekly, published on Thursdays. There is a local radio station, WPEZ 93.7 FM.

Notable people
 Larry Anderson, basketball coach for MIT
 Buster Barnett, former NFL player for the Buffalo Bills
 Carey Bell, blues harmonicist
 Cornelius Cash, basketball player
 Eddy Clearwater, blues guitarist and singer, born Edward Harrington in Macon in 1935. Cousin of Harmonicist Carey Bell.
 Darion Conner, former professional football player with the Atlanta Falcons
 Willie Daniel, NFL football player
 Jesse Fortune, blues singer
 Victoria Clay Haley, suffragist
 Nate Hughes, former professional football player with Jacksonville Jaguars, and Detroit Lions
 Stephen D. Lee, confederate general, slaveholder, farmed the Devereaux plantation for ten years.
 Samuel Pandolfo, businessman
 America W. Robinson, African American educator; contralto (Fisk Jubilee Singers)
 Deontae Skinner, NFL player
 Purvis Short, former professional basketball player
 Nate Wayne, former NFL football player with Green Bay Packers, Denver Broncos, and Philadelphia Eagles
 Israel Victor Welch, Confederate politician and lawyer lived in Macon after the war
 Margaret Murray Washington, educator; wife of Booker T. Washington
 Ben Ames Williams, novelist

See also

References

External links

Cities in Mississippi
Cities in Noxubee County, Mississippi
County seats in Mississippi
1833 establishments in Mississippi